Gromki is a rural locality (a khutor) in Svetloyarsky District, Volgograd Oblast, Russia. The population was 47 as of 2010. There are 3 streets.

Geography 
Gromki is located 161 km northeast of Svetly Yar (the district's administrative centre) by road. Leshchev is the nearest rural locality.

References 

Rural localities in Svetloyarsky District